Myra-Bellevue Provincial Park is a provincial park in British Columbia, Canada, located in the Okanagan Highland east of Kelowna. It was established to protect the full elevational range of the North Okanagan Basin and North Okanagan Highlands ecosections.

Features 
Myra-Bellevue Provincial Park includes:
 Angel Springs
 Bellevue Canyon
 Myra Canyon
 18 trestles and 2 tunnels of the Kettle Valley Railway line, now a cycling and hiking route
 Little White Mountain, noted for its escarpment

Flora 
includes:

 Old Growth Ponderosa Pine
 Old Growth Douglas Fir
 Larch
 Engelmann Spruce
 Subalpine Fir

Fauna 
includes:
 Mountain goats in winter
 White-throated Swifts
 Flammulated Owl
 Lewis’ Woodpecker
 Spotted Bat
 Boreal Owl
 Western Screech-owl
 Northern Alligator Lizard
 Elk
 Deer
 Moose
 Cougar
 Grizzly Bear
 Great Basin Pocket Mouse
 Spotted Bat

Images

References

External links
Myra Canyon Trestle Restoration Society
The Friends of South Slopes Society

Provincial parks of British Columbia
Regional District of Central Okanagan
Provincial parks in the Okanagan
2001 establishments in British Columbia
Protected areas established in 2001